Lysá nad Labem is a town in Nymburk District in the Central Bohemian Region of the Czech Republic. It has about 9,700 inhabitants. It is situated on the Elbe river. The town centre is well preserved and is protected by law as an urban monument zone.

Administrative parts
Villages of Byšičky, Dvorce and Litol are administrative parts of Lysá nad Labem.

Geography

It lies mostly in the Central Elbe Table lowland within the Polabí region. The town is situated on the right bank of the Elbe River.

History

Lysá nad Labem was firstly mentioned in the Chronica Boemorum, with its existence mentioned in 1034. In the 13th century, a castle was built here and until the reign of the Luxembourgs, the town was property of the Czech queens. Since 1291, there has been evidence of Lysá being a town. In that year, Queen Judith of Habsburg issued a charter to unite the settlements of the Lysá estate into one economic unit.

During the Hussite Wars the town suffered a lot. At the turn of the 15th and 16th century, the Smiřický family of Smiřice rebuilt the dilapidated castle into a late-Gothic castle. In 1548, Emperor Ferdinand I added Lysá to the intimate dominion as a hunting centre. After a large fire, he had the castle rebuilt in the Renaissance style.

The sustainable development of the town was stopped by the Thirty Years' War. In 1647, Lysá was acquired by the empire general Johann von Sporck and then the town began to flourish. After the general's death, his son Franz Anton von Sporck began to reign. He made the most important changes in 1696 when the Augustinian monastery was restored and the new parish church and the Chapel of Three Kings were built.

In 1950, the municipality of Litol was merged with the town.

Demographics

Transport
Lysá nad Labem is an important hub in the railroad network. It is located at the intersection of the routes to and from Kolín – Prague/Ústí nad Labem. In addition, a local single-track railway to Milovice also branches out from the station.

Culture
Lysá nad Labem is known for the horse racing course and its exhibition grounds where many thematic exhibitions are held during the whole year.

Sights

The notable buildings of the town are the Augustinian monastery, neighbouring with the Baroque castle with a valuable castle park, and the Baroque Church of Saint John the Baptist. Baroque monuments are here thanks to the reign of count Franz Anton von Sporck, who invited many Baroque artists to the town. The most famous of them was the sculptor Matthias Braun. Braun with his pupils sculpted many statues for the town, many of which decorate the castle park. Nowadays, the castle serves as a retirement house, but the  large castle park is open to the public.

Bedřich Hrozný Museum is an exposition in a newly reconstructed Baroque building, which is a cultural monument. The exhibition focuses on regional history, and on the area of the ancient Near East and scientific activity of Bedřich Hrozný, who was a leading Orientalist and decipherer of the Hittite language.

Notable people
Franz Anton von Sporck (1662–1738), literatus and patron of the arts
Bedřich Hrozný (1879–1952), Orientalist and linguist

Twin towns – sister cities

Lysá nad Labem is twinned with:
 Břeclav, Czech Republic
 Głogów Małopolski, Poland
 Kukeziv, Ukraine

References

External links

Lysá nad Labem photo gallery

Cities and towns in the Czech Republic
Populated places in Nymburk District